Alfredo "Chacho" Vega (born February 2, 1935, in San Lorenzo, Paraguay - died February 14, 2012, in San Lorenzo, Paraguay) is a retired Paraguayan footballer who played for clubs of Paraguay, Brazil, Chile and Colombia.

Teams
  Libertad 1949-1957
  Santos 1958-1959
  Santiago Morning 1960
  Cerro Porteño 1960-1961
  Deportivo Pereira 1962-1970

References
 Profile at BDFA 

1935 births
2012 deaths
Paraguayan footballers
Paraguayan expatriate footballers
Paraguay international footballers
Club Libertad footballers
Cerro Porteño players
Santiago Morning footballers
Deportivo Pereira footballers
Chilean Primera División players
Expatriate footballers in Chile
Expatriate footballers in Brazil
Expatriate footballers in Colombia
Association football midfielders